Stolberg-Stolberg was a county of the Holy Roman Empire located in the southern Harz region. Its capital was the town of Stolberg, now in Saxony-Anhalt, Germany. It was ruled by a branch of the House of Stolberg.

In 1429, the County of Wernigerode passed to the Counts of Stolberg, who ruled Wernigerode through a personal union. In 1548, the line was split between a Harz line (Stolberg-Stolberg) and a Rhenish line which had possessions in Rochefort (Stolberg-Rochefort) and Königstein im Taunus (Stolberg-Königstein).

With the death of Count Wolf Georg zu Stolberg in 1631, Stolberg-Stolberg was inherited by members of the Rhenish line. On 31 May 1645, Stolberg-Stolberg was divided between a senior Stolberg-Wernigerode line and a junior Stolberg-Stolberg line. In 1706, Stolberg-Stolberg divided again, with Stolberg-Rossla being created.

Stolberg-Stolberg was forced to recognize the suzerainty of the Electorate of Saxony in 1738. It was awarded to the Kingdom of Prussia in the 1815 Congress of Vienna.

The children of Fürsten and Erbprinzen zu Stolberg-Wernigerode bore the title of Prince[ss] (Prinz[essin]) zu Stolberg-Wernigerode and were styled Serene Highness. Other members of this line bore the title of Count[ess] (Graf/Gräfin) zu Stolberg-Wernigerode, with the style of Illustrious Highness.

Rulers of Stolberg-Stolberg

Counts of Stolberg-Stolberg 

 Christoph Friedrich (1704-1738)
 Christoph Ludwig II (1738-1761), son
 Karl Ludwig (1761-1815), son, mediatised in 1803
 Joseph (1815-1839), son
 Alfred (1839-1903), Fürst from 1893 on

Princes of Stolberg-Stolberg  

  Alfred, 1st Prince 1893-1903 (1820-1903)
  Wolffgang, 2nd Prince 1903 (1849-1903)
  Wolff-Heinrich, 3rd Prince 1903-1972 (1903-1972)
  Jost-Christian, 4th Prince 1972-present (b.1940)
 Christoph, Hereditary Prince of Stolberg-Stolberg (b.1982)
  Prince Heinrich-Victor (b.1986)

References

States and territories established in 1548
States and territories established in 1638
States and territories established in 1706
1548 establishments in the Holy Roman Empire
1631 establishments in the Holy Roman Empire
1638 establishments in the Holy Roman Empire
1706 establishments in the Holy Roman Empire
1631 disestablishments in the Holy Roman Empire
1684 disestablishments in the Holy Roman Empire
1803 disestablishments in the Holy Roman Empire
Former states and territories of Saxony-Anhalt